The 1985 San Marino Grand Prix was a Formula One motor race held at Imola on 5 May 1985. It was the third race of the 1985 Formula One World Championship. The 60-lap race was won by Elio de Angelis, driving a Lotus-Renault, after McLaren driver Alain Prost had been disqualified for being underweight. Thierry Boutsen was second in an Arrows-BMW, with Patrick Tambay third in a factory Renault.

Qualifying

Qualifying report
Before the previous race in Portugal it was revealed that René Arnoux had been fired by Ferrari, with no explanation ever given for his sudden departure by either the team or Arnoux. In his place was Swedish driver Stefan Johansson. Arnoux was in the pits at Imola, but was seen with the Brabham team, starting a false rumor he would soon join the team alongside Nelson Piquet.

Ayrton Senna took pole position in his Lotus-Renault with a time of 1:27.327, with Keke Rosberg alongside him on the front row in the Williams-Honda. For Senna it would be the first of seven consecutive pole positions at Imola, a run which ended in 1992.

Filling the second row were Elio de Angelis in the second Lotus and Michele Alboreto in the Ferrari. Belgian Thierry Boutsen was a surprise 5th fastest in the Arrows-BMW, ahead of the McLaren-TAG of Alain Prost. In his second race for Ferrari, Johansson qualified 15th.

Qualifying classification

Race

Race report
Limited fuel allowances played a big part in the race, as a succession of drivers ran out of fuel in the last few laps. Prost took the chequered flag before stopping on the slowing-down lap and hitching a ride with Patrick Tambay on the side pod to return to the pits. Later, Prost's car was found to be two kilograms underweight in post-race scrutineering, resulting in his disqualification. Summing up the general feeling that FISA's fuel limit rules had seen Formula One races reduced to mere economy runs, Williams driver Nigel Mansell noted that "it wasn't really racing".

Stefan Johansson ran a good race in his second drive for Ferrari. After starting 15th he steadily made his way through the field and by late in the race had moved to second (benefiting from others running out of fuel) and was poised to benefit from Senna also running dry 3 laps from home. Johansson took the lead from the Lotus to a thunderous applause from the Italian fans, only to run out of fuel himself half a lap later coming out of the Acque Minerali chicane. A post race examination of his car revealed the Ferrari had an electrical malfunction that caused the engine to use more fuel than the readout was telling the team or Johansson. The Ferrari's readout had told Johansson that he still had enough fuel to finish the race.

Prost's disqualification promoted de Angelis to the win, his second in F1, with second place awarded to Boutsen — who ran out of fuel as he reached the start-finish straight on his final lap and pushed his Arrows across the finish line to secure his finishing position — and third to Frenchman Patrick Tambay, in what would turn out to be the last podium finish for both Tambay and the original factory Renault team. Mauro Baldi and Spirit Racing entered their last Grand Prix: the small British team were having financial troubles and the Toleman team offered to buy out their tyre contract: Spirit accepted and withdrew from the championship, allowing Toleman to race for the rest of the season.

Race classification

Championship standings after the race

Drivers' Championship standings

Constructors' Championship standings

References

San Marino Grand Prix
San Marino Grand Prix
San Marino Grand Prix